Baseman may refer to:

Sports
 In baseball, the term baseman can refer to the following positions:
First baseman 
Second baseman 
Third baseman

People with the surname
Gary Baseman (born 1960), American artist